This is a list of programs currently, formerly, and soon to be broadcast by the Israeli Educational Television.

IETV productions
This is a list of prominent IETV TV shows currently and formerly broadcast on IETV.

Imported TV shows broadcast on IETV

Children's

3-2-1 Penguins
A Thousand and One... Americas
Adventures of the Little Mermaid
The Adventures of Peter Pan
Alfred J. Kwak
Amigo and Friends
Angelina Ballerina
Angelina Ballerina: The Next Steps
Archibald le Magi-chien
The Babaloos
Babar
Bananas in Pyjamas
Bangers and Mash
Barney
Boule et Bill
Bear in the Big Blue House
The Bear's Island
Beat Bugs
Bertha
The Blobs
Bo on the Go
Bob the Builder
Bobobobs
Boffins
Budgie the Little Helicopter
Bug Alert
Bumpety Boo
Calimero
The Caribou Kitchen
Charlie and Lola
Connie the Cow
Cushion Kids
Delfy and His Friends
Dino Babies
Dinosaur Train
Dr Otter
The Fairytaler
Fiddley Foodle Bird
The Forgotten Toys
Fraggle Rock
Funnybones
The Funny Company
Gordon the Garden Gnome
Happily Ever After: Fairy Tales for Every Child
Hello Kitty and Friends
Here Comes the Grump
Holly the Ghost
Huckleberry no Bōken
Inspector Gadget
It's Punky Brewster
Jay Jay the Jet Plane
Jim Henson's Animal Show
Jim Henson's Mother Goose Stories
Jimbo and the Jet Set
Joe the Little Boom Boom
Johnson and Friends
Kassai and Leuk
Kissyfur
Kitty Cats
The Legend of Snow White
The Littl' Bits
Little Wizards
Little Women 
The Magic Key
Magic Mountain
Martha Speaks
Moomins
Mopatop's Shop
Mr. Men and Little Miss
Mrs. Pepper Pot
Nanook
The New Adventures of Ocean Girl
Nilus the Sandman
The Ollie & Moon Show
Once Upon a Time... Life
Once Upon a Time... Man
Oscar's Orchestra
Oswald
Ox Tales
Papa Beaver's Storytime
Parasol Henbē
Pirates: Adventures in Art
Polka Dot Shorts
The Pondles
Postman Pat
Potamus Park
The Puzzle Place
Raggs
The Raggy Dolls
Ready Jet Go!
Really Wild Animals
Rimba's Island
Rubbish, King of the Jumble
Saban’s Gulliver’s Travels
The Secret Show
Shaun the Sheep
Shelldon
The Shoe People
The Silver Brumby
The Slow Norris
The Smurfs
Splash and Bubbles
Storybook International
Taotao
Teddybears
Thomas & Friends
Tip en Tap
Tots TV
TV Colosso
The Winjin Pom
Wisdom of the Gnomes
The Wizard of Oz
The Wonderful Wizard of Oz
WordWorld
The World of David the Gnome
The Wubbulous World of Dr. Seuss
Zack & Quack

TV series
 Blizzard Island
 Chocky
 Crossbow
 Dick Turpin
 Jack Holborn
 Just William
 Katts and Dog
 Knights of God
 Lost
 The Lost Islands
 Mad Men
 Mission: Impossible
 The Prisoner
 Rags to riches
 Sidekicks
 Star Trek: The Next Generation
 Star Trek: The Original Series
 The Storyteller
 T. and T.
 The Time Tunnel
 Waterloo Road
 The West Wing

Sitcoms
 ALF
 The Charmings
 Full House
 Small Wonder
 That '70s Show
 Eric's World
 Sister, Sister
 Soap
 The Golden Girls
 Happy Days
 Parker Lewis Can't Lose
 The Wonder Years

Israeli Educational Television
 
Israeli television-related lists